Kelley Puckett is a comic book writer. He is notable for having co-created DC Comics characters Cassandra Cain and Connor Hawke.

Bibliography

DC Comics
 Batgirl #1-19, 21–25, 27–29, 33-37
 The Batman and Robin Adventures #24
 Batman & Robin Adventures: Subzero #1
 The Batman Adventures vol. 1 #1-3, 5-30, 34-35
 The Batman Chronicles #12, 35
 Batman Secret Files and Origins #1
 Batman Villains Secret Files and Origins #1
 Batman #566-567
 Batman/Nightwing: Bloodborne #1
 Batman: Batgirl
 Batman: Batgirl vol. 2 #1
 Batman: Gotham Adventures #13
 Batman: Gotham City Secret Files and Origins #1
 Batman: Mask of the Phantasm - The Animated Movie #1
 Batman: No Man's Land Secret Files and Origins #1
 Captain Atom #51
 Cartoon Network Action Pack #55
 The Comet vol. 2 Annual #1
 DC Comics Presents: Batman Adventures #1
 DCU Infinite Holiday Special #1
 Detective Comics #634, 734
 Green Arrow vol. 2 #0, 91-92
 Kinetic #1-8
 Legends of the DC Universe #6, 10-11
 The Question Quarterly #5
 Showcase '96 #6
 Supergirl vol. 5 #23-29, 31-32
 Superman & Batman Magazine #1-2, 4, 6
 Superman Adventures #47

References

 

Living people
Year of birth missing (living people)
American comics writers